Ligialaelaps is a genus of mites in the family Laelapidae.

Species
 Ligialaelaps ewingi (Pearse, 1930)

References

Laelapidae